The Fatal Mallet is a 1914 American-made motion picture starring Charles Chaplin and Mabel Normand.  The film was written and directed by Mack Sennett, who also portrays one of Chaplin's rivals for Normand's attention. (Sennett and Normand were off-screen lovers  during this period.)

The Fatal Mallet is one of more than a dozen early films that writer/director/comedian Mabel Normand made with Charles Chaplin; Normand, who had written and directed films before Chaplin, mentored the young comedian.

Synopsis
Three men will fight for the love of a charming girl. Charlie (in famous tramp guise) and one other suitor (unusually played by Mack Sennett himself) teams up against the third, and play dirty, throwing bricks and using a mallet. However, Charlie double-crosses his partner, thus losing his trust and the girl in the end.

Reviews
A reviewer for Moving Picture World said of The Fatal Mallet, "This one-reeler proves that hitting people over the head with bricks and mallets can sometimes be made amusing."

A reviewer for Bioscope positively wrote, "Though rivals in love for the beautiful Mabel Normand, Charles Chaplin and Mack Sennett combine to rid themselves of a third poacher on their preserves, and the employment of a deadly mallet gives these indescribable comedians the opportunity for another genuinely funny farce."

Cast
 Charles Chaplin - Suitor
 Mabel Normand - Mabel
 Mack Sennett - Rival suitor
 Mack Swain - Another rival

See also
 List of American films of 1914
 Charlie Chaplin filmography

External links

 

1914 films
1914 comedy films
American silent short films
American black-and-white films
Films directed by Mack Sennett
Films produced by Mack Sennett
1914 short films
Silent American comedy films
Articles containing video clips
American comedy short films
1910s American films